Aaly Tokombaev (Aalı Toqombayev, االى توقومبايەۋ; November 7, 1904 – June 19, 1988)  was a poet, composer, and a famous novelist who greatly influenced the Kyrgyz nation. In 1927 he graduated from the Middle Asian Community University (presently National University of Uzbekistan, in Tashkent. After graduation, he fully devoted himself to Soviet Kyrgyz literature.

In the following years of 1927 through 1940 he began to write a collection of poems. Tokombaev published the collections Lenin (1927), Flowers of Labor (1932), and Early Poems (1934) and the novellas The Dnieper Empties into the Deep Sea (1939) and The Wounded Heart (1940). Throughout the Great Patriotic War (1941–1945) he wrote patriotic and narrative poems through which he expressed his opinions, ideas, and beliefs.

In his time Kyrgyzstan was the scene of a struggle between tsarism and Soviet rule. He wrote such novels as Before the Dawn, Part 1; Bloody Years (1935); Before the Dawn, Part 2 (1947). Through those books he expressed opinions on the unfair rule and treatment of the Kyrgyz people.

He died in 1988.

Major works 

(Russian/Kyrgyz titles in parentheses)
 About Lenin ("Ленин тууралу", 1927)
 Mirror of a woman ("Зеркало женщины", 1929)
 Flowers of work ("Эмгек гүлү", 1932)
 Attack ("Атака", 1932)
 Early verses ("Абалкы ырлар", 1934)
 Dnestr flow into deep sea ("Днестр терең деңизге куят", 1939)
 Wounded heart ("Жараланган жүрөк", 1940)
 With my own eyes ("Өз көзүм менен", 1952)
 My birth certificate ("Менин метрикам", 1955)
 Face to Face ("Лицом к лицу", 1957)
 Time flies ("Время летит", 1958)
 Investigation is going on ("Тергөө жүрүп жатат", 1962)
 Melodies of komuz  ("Мелодии комуза", 1962)
 We were soldiers ("Мы были солдатами", 1974)
 Master ("Мастер", 1982)
 Toktogul ("Токтогул", 2014)

Honours and awards

 Order of Lenin
 Order of the Red Banner of Labour
 Order of the Badge of Honour

Legacy

Eponyms

Prospect after Aaly Tokombaev, a street in southern part of Bishkek, named in 1990.

Memorials
 Aaly Tokmbaev's memorial near Bishkek Opera and Ballet Theater.

Museums
 Museum after A.Tokmbaev in Bishkek

References

External links
 Bibliography at thefreedictionary.com

Soviet poets
Male poets
Soviet male writers
20th-century male writers
Heroes of Socialist Labour
Recipients of the Order of Lenin
1904 births
1988 deaths
National University of Uzbekistan alumni